Edmund Nick (Reichenberg – , Geretsried) was a German composer, conductor, and music writer.

Biography
The son of a merchant, Nick studied law from 1910 to 1915 in Vienna and Graz. At the same time, he studied music at the Vienna Music Academy and at the Conservatorium Dresden. He received his doctorate in law (Dr. jur.) from the University Graz in 1918. Nick moved to Breslau in 1919, working as concert accompanist, piano teacher and critic. He became Kapellmeister of the theatre in Breslau in 1921 and Head of the Music Department of Radio Silesia in 1924.

It was here that he first met Erich Kästner; Nick wrote the music to a radio play by Kästner which became very successful. This was the beginning of a lifelong friendship.

When he was dismissed in 1933, he moved to Berlin, where he was Head of Music at the Theater des Volkes from 1936 to 1940.

In 1945 he moved to Munich, starting as a critic at the Neue Zeitung. He then became Musical Director of the cabaret Die Schaubude where he continued his collaboration with Erich Kästner; eventually, he set more than 60 of Kästner's works to music. In 1947 he became for two years chief conductor of the Bavarian State Operetta. He was made Professor in 1949 at the Hochschule für Musik und Theater München; from 1952 to 1956 he was head of the music department of the Westdeutscher Rundfunk in Cologne. He then worked as a music critic for the paper Die Welt, and since 1962 for the Süddeutsche Zeitung.

He wrote piano works, chamber music, film scores, and music for theatre and radio plays; he is mostly known for his musical comedies and operettas.

Stage works
Selected stage works:

Operettas

Über alles siegt die Liebe (based on Karl Gutzkow's Zopf und Schwert) (1940 Berlin, Theater des Volkes)
Das Halsband der Königin (Gerhard Metzner) (1 December 1948 Munich, Bavarian State Operetta)

Musical comedies
Das kleine Hofkonzert (Paul Verhoeven, Toni Impekoven) (19 November 1935 Munich, Munich Kammerspiele)
Die glücklichen Tage (1937 Bremen)
Xantippe (1938 Frankfurt (Main))
Titus macht Karriere (based on Talisman by Johann Nestroy by Gerhard Metzner) (1939 Berlin, Theater an der Behrenstraße)
Nur für Erwachsene (1941 Berlin)
Dreimal die Eine (1941 Leipzig)
Karussell! – Karussell! (Gustel Graepp, Rudolf Rieth) (1941 Darmstadt)
Der Prinzgemahl (Fritz Schwiefert) (1938)

Revues
Freut euch des Lebens! (1936 Berlin)

References

Reclams Operettenführer, pp. 272–273,  (ed.), Stuttgart 1962

External links
 

1891 births
1974 deaths
German opera composers
Male opera composers
20th-century classical composers
Musicians from Liberec
Academic staff of the University of Music and Performing Arts Munich
German male classical composers
20th-century German composers
Burials at the Westfriedhof (Munich)
20th-century German male musicians
German Bohemian people